Cicindela latesignata is a ground beetle in the genus Cicindela ("common tiger beetles"), in the subfamily Cicindelinae ("tiger beetles"). Common names are "Western beach tiger beetle" and "Angel's tear".
The distribution range of Cicindela latesignata includes Central America and North America. It is native to the Continental US and Mexico.

References

Further reading
 American Beetles, Volume I: Archostemata, Myxophaga, Adephaga, Polyphaga: Staphyliniformia, Arnett, R.H. Jr., and M. C. Thomas. (eds.). 2000. CRC Press LLC, Boca Raton, FL.
 American Insects: A Handbook of the Insects of America North of Mexico, Ross H. Arnett. 2000. CRC Press.
 Bousquet, Yves (2012). Catalogue of Geadephaga (Coleoptera, Adephaga) of America, north of Mexico. ZooKeys, issue 245, 1–1722.
 Freitag, Richard (1999). Catalogue of the tiger beetles of Canada and the United States, vii + 195.
 Peterson Field Guides: Beetles, Richard E. White. 1983. Houghton Mifflin Company.

External links
NCBI Taxonomy Browser, Cicindela latesignata

latesignata
Beetles described in 1851